The Union Township School Corporation is the school system that serves Union Township, Porter County, Indiana, USA.  Union Township is predominantly a rural area.

Schools
 Wheeler High School, 587 W 300 N
 Union Township Middle School, 599 W 300 N
 Union Center Elementary School, 272 N 600 W
 John Simatovich Elementary School, 424 W 500 N

References

Web site

School districts in Indiana
Education in Porter County, Indiana